Christian Bataille (born 31 May 1946 in Rieux-en-Cambrésis) was a member of the National Assembly of France who represented the Nord department, as is a member of the Socialist Party (Parti Socialiste) and belongs to the SRC parliamentary group.

He represented Nord's 22nd constituency from 1988 until the 2012 election (the constituency was abolished in the 2010 redistricting).  He then represented the 12th constituency until 2017.

References

External links
Assemblée nationale

1950 births
Living people
People from Nord (French department)
Socialist Party (France) politicians
Deputies of the 9th National Assembly of the French Fifth Republic
Deputies of the 10th National Assembly of the French Fifth Republic
Deputies of the 11th National Assembly of the French Fifth Republic
Deputies of the 12th National Assembly of the French Fifth Republic
Deputies of the 13th National Assembly of the French Fifth Republic
Deputies of the 14th National Assembly of the French Fifth Republic